This is a list of women writers who were born in Belgium or  whose writings are closely associated with that country.

A
Christine Aventin (born 1971), best selling novelist, author of Le cœur en poche when just 15

B
Julia Bastin (1888–1968), French-language educator, novelist, translator
Marguerite Baulu (1870–1942), French-language novelist
Gabrielle Bernard (1893–1963), Walloon-language poet
Rose Berryl (born 1982), novelist
Bessora (born 1968), French-language novelist, short story writer
Madeleine Bourdouxhe (1906–1996), French-language novelist 
Caroline Boussart (1893–1963), French-language journalist, short story writer, non-fiction writer, feminist
Louise Bovie (1810–1870), French-language poet, short story writer
Renée Brock (1912–1980), French-language poet, short story writer
Elisa Brune (1966–2018), French-language novelist, journalist

C
Jeanne Cappe (1895–1956), French-language young adults writer, journalist, editor
Élise Champagne (1897–1983), French-language poet, journalist
Marie Closset (1873–1952), French-language poet, pen name Jean Dominique
Anne Cluysenaar (1936–2014), Belgian-born Irish poet
Marguerite Coppin (1867–1931), French-language novelist, poet, feminist
Joanna Courtmans (1811–1890), Dutch-language poet, novelist
Coralie van den Cruyce (1796–1858), writer, feminist and poet, writing in French

D
Saskia De Coster (born 1976), Dutch-language short story writer, novelist, columnist
Christine D'haen (1923–2009), Dutch-language poet, biographer, translator
Eugénie De Keyser (1918–2012), French-language essayist, novelist, educator
Patricia De Martelaere (1957–2009), Dutch-language novelist, essayist, non-fiction philosophical works
Els de Schepper (born 1965), Flemish actress and writer
Gabriëlle Demedts (1909–2002), Flemish poet
Rita Demeester (1946–1993), Dutch-language poet, novelist
Sophie Deroisin, pen name of Marie de Romrée de Vichenet, (1909–1994), French-language novelist
Maria Doolaeghe (1803–1884), Dutch-language poet, translator, non-fiction writer
Louis Dubrau, pen name of  Louise Janson-Scheidt, (1904–1997), French-language poet, novelist

F
Michèle Fabien (1945–1999), French-language playwright 
Pascale Fonteneau (born 1963), French-born Belgian journalist and novelist, wrote crime fiction for Série noire
Vera Feyder (born 1939), Belgian novelist, poet and playwright
Maud Frère (1923–1979), French-language novelist

G
Michèle Gérard (1945–1999), playwright, translator, used the pen name Michèle Fabien
Marie Gevers (1883–1975), French-language novelist, translator, first women elected to Belgium's French-language academy
Caroline Gravière (1821–1878), French-language novelist
Éliane Gubin (born 1942), French-language historian, researcher, professor

H
Eugénie Hamer (1865–after 1926), French-language peace activist and writer
Irène Hamoir (1906–1994), French-language surrealist poet, novelist
Jacqueline Harpman (1929–2012), French-language novelist
Marie-Louise Haumont (1919–2012), French-language novelist
Kristien Hemmerechts (born 1955), Dutch-language novelist, short story writer

J
Lieve Joris (born 1953), non-fiction Dutch-language writer specializing in travel in Africa and the Middle East

L
Rachida Lamrabet (born 1970), Dutch-language novelist, short story writer, playwright
Ariane Le Fort (born 1960), French-language journalist, novelist
Suzanne Lilar (1901–1992), French-language journalist, essayist, novelist, playwright, feminist
Rosalie Loveling (1834–1875), Dutch-language poet, novelist, essayist
Virginie Loveling (1836–1923), younger sister of Rosalie (above), Dutch-language poet, novelist, essayist and children's writer

M
Malika Madi (born 1967), French-language novelist of Algerian origin
Nicole Malinconi (born 1946), French-language novelist
Françoise Mallet-Joris (1930–2016), French-language novelist
Cécile Miguel (1921–2001), French-language writer and artist
Capucine Motte (born 1971), Belgian-born French novelist
Chantal Mouffe (born 1943), political theorist, academic and writer
Jeanine Moulin (1912–1998), poet, literary scholar

N
Alice Nahon (1896–1933), Dutch-language poet
Marie Nizet (1859–1922), French-language poet
Amélie Nothomb (born 1966), highly successful French-language novelist, short story writer, several works translated into English
Colette Nys-Mazure (born 1939), French-language poet, novelist, short story writer, playwright, several works translated into English

O
Barbara Ogier (1648–1720), Flemish playwright

P
Marie Parent (1853–1934), Belgian journal editor, temperance activist, feminist and suffragist
Sophie Podolski (1953–1974), French-language poet and graphic artist
Anne Provoost (born 1964), Dutch-language novelist, essayist and short story writer, often writing for young adults
Maria Pypelinckx (1538–1608), Dutch-language writer

R
Hilda Ram (1858–1901), Flemish writer
Céline Renooz (1840–1928), non-fiction scientific works on evolution, epistemology, historiography
Dominique Rolin (1913–2012), French-language novelist
Maria Rosseels (1916–2005), Dutch-language journalist, novelist, essayist, critic
Angélique de Rouillé (1756–1840), French-language letter writer

S
Fanny Zampini Salazar (1853–1931), Belgian-born Italian writer and lecturer
Aline Sax (born 1984), Flemish young people's novelist
Carla Serena (1820–1884), writer and explorer
Isabelle Spaak (born 1960), novelist, non-fiction writer
Lize Spit (born 1988), Flemish novelist
Lucienne Stassaert (born 1936), Dutch-language poet, playwright
Irène Stecyk (born 1937), French language novelist

U
Chika Unigwe (born 1974), Nigerian-born, Belgian-immigrant novelist, short story writer, poet, children's writer, writes in Dutch and English

V
Marianne Van Hirtum (1925–1988), French-language surrealist poet
Monika van Paemel (born 1945), Dutch-language (often autobiographical) novelist
Louise van den Plas (1877–1968), suffragist and French-language writer
Sylvia Vanden Heede (born 1961), Flemish children's writer
Hilde Vandermeeren (born 1970), Dutch-language children's writer, newspaper editor, novelist
Annelies Verbeke (born 1976), Dutch-language writer, successful novelist, also short story writer, playwright
Stephanie Vetter (1884–1974), Dutch-born Belgian novelist, short story writer, women's rights advocate
Maria de Villegas de Saint-Pierre (1870–1941), French-language writer and nurse

W
Carla Walschap (born 1932), Dutch-language novelist, evoking lesbianism in De Eskimo en de roos
Monique Watteau (born 1929), acclaimed French-language novelist, illustrator
Sandrine Willems (born 1968), French-language writer, television documentary director
Évelyne Wilwerth (born 1947), French-language poet, novelist, short story writer, playwright
Liliane Wouters (1930–2016), poet, playwright, essayist, several works translated into English

Y
Marguerite Yourcenar (1903–1987), French-language novelist, essayist, translator, first woman elected to the Académie française

See also
List of women writers
List of French-language authors
List of Dutch-language writers

References

External links
Renée Laurentine, Les écrivaines francophones de Belgique au XXe siècle

-
Belgian women writers, List of
Writers, List of Belgian
Women writers, List of Belgian